Jang Jae-Geun (born 2 January 1962) is a Korean former sprinter who competed in the 1984 Summer Olympics and in the 1988 Summer Olympics.

References

1962 births
Living people
South Korean male sprinters
Olympic athletes of South Korea
Athletes (track and field) at the 1984 Summer Olympics
Athletes (track and field) at the 1988 Summer Olympics
Asian Games medalists in athletics (track and field)
Athletes (track and field) at the 1982 Asian Games
Athletes (track and field) at the 1986 Asian Games
Universiade medalists in athletics (track and field)
Asian Games gold medalists for South Korea
Asian Games silver medalists for South Korea
Asian Games bronze medalists for South Korea
Medalists at the 1982 Asian Games
Medalists at the 1986 Asian Games
Universiade bronze medalists for South Korea
20th-century South Korean people